Mulligans is a 2008 Canadian romantic drama film written by actor/writer Charlie David and directed by Chip Hale. It also stars Dan Payne, 
Derek James and Thea Gill (of Queer as Folk and Dante's Cove).

Plot 
Tyler Davidson invites his college buddy Chase home for summer break on Prospect Lake. The Davidson family appears practically perfect in every way to Chase, in contrast to his own dysfunctional family with whom he is not close. After continued attempts by Tyler to set up Chase with local girls, Chase comes out to Tyler and tells him he is gay. The family attempts to support Chase, and Tyler's father Nathan in particular begins to spend substantial time with him. Soon Nathan begins to realize that his own long-suppressed feelings toward men are resurfacing, and he has become attracted to Chase. These attractions turn into a brief affair, which is soon witnessed by Nathan's wife Stacey and later by Tyler. Once in the open, Nathan and Chase try to come to terms with the effect of their actions on others, as the friendship between Tyler and Chase is ruined, and Nathan attempts to keep his family together. Nathan ultimately decides to leave Stacey, Tyler, and their daughter at the family's summer home, while he drives off to re-evaluate his life alone.

Cast 
Dan Payne as Nathan Davidson
Thea Gill as Stacey Davidson
Charlie David as Chase Rousseau
Derek James as Tyler Davidson
Grace Wolf/Grace Vukovic as Birdie Davidson

Soundtrack 
The film contains three original songs by musician Ben Sigston; "Smile", "Waiting Room" and "Turn Around". The alternative rock band Kingsley also provide the song "Rain Down".

Reception 
Film critic Don Willmott from Filmcritic.com gave the film a score of 2.5/5, stating: "Writer/star Charlie David may have wanted to keep things low key, but the movie ends up coming across as low voltage".

Michael D. Klemm of Cinemaqueer.com stated that "Mulligans doesn't suck – not by a long shot – but, after a promising start, it winds up overstaying its welcome."

References

External links 

2008 films
2008 romantic drama films
2008 LGBT-related films
LGBT-related coming-of-age films
Canadian LGBT-related films
LGBT-related romantic drama films
English-language Canadian films
2000s English-language films
Gay-related films
Canadian romantic drama films
2000s Canadian films